The Adliswil-Felsenegg cable car (LAF;  or ) is a cable car in the canton of Zürich in Switzerland. The lower station is located in Adliswil in the Sihl Valley, whilst the upper station is located on the Felsenegg hill on the Albis ridge near the Felsenegg-Girstel TV-tower.

The cable car is owned by the Luftseilbahn Adliswil-Felsenegg AG and is operated by the Sihltal Zürich Uetliberg Bahn (SZU), the railway company which links both Adliswil and the Uetliberg to the city of Zürich.

History 
The cable car was built by the Swiss company Von Roll, opening on 30 December 1954. In 1960, these cabins were replaced by new cabins with a capacity of 30 passengers, constructed by SIG Neuhausen, and the cables were replaced. In 1977, a majority shareholding was acquired by the Swiss company Denner AG. In 1986, the line was converted to automatic operation. In 1990, the line became part of the zonal tariff structure of the Zürcher Verkehrsverbund (ZVV), and in 1994 self-service ticketing was introduced, with ticket machines at both stations. In 1997, the drive and brake systems were replaced.

The line celebrated its 50th anniversary in 2004, when a complete renewal was planned according to the conditions for the license given by the Swiss government. The renewal cost 3.5 million Swiss francs, which was financed by the municipality of Adliswil, the city of Zürich (300,000 each), the ZVV (2 million), and by public fundraising and sponsorship. The renewal included the control and monitoring system, whilst the cabins were replaced by more comfortable, spacious and "sleek" cabins constructed by CWA Constructions SA. The masts and carrying ropes were strengthened, and both the valley and mountain stations renewed. The renewal took place between 4 February and 30 April, with the line re-opening on 1 May 2008.

On 31 March 2010, the 10th million passenger used the cableway. In 2014, the regular 6-yearly revision of the line was undertaken. In 2016, the upper station was renovated.

Operation 
The Adliswil-Felsenegg cable car is technically an aerial tramway, where the two cabins are suspended from a single support cable whilst being permanently attached to a second propulsion cable. The two cars shuttle between upper and lower stations, and must operate together so that when one car is at the lower station, the other will be at the upper station. The line is operated automatically, under the supervision of a single employee located at the lower station. The cabins and upper station are normally unmanned.

The car runs every 15 minutes, or more often if traffic requires it. Depending on the time of the year and the day of the week, cars run from either 08:00 or 09:00 to either 20:00 or 22:00.

Gallery

References

External links 
 
  
 Video descent of the line

Cable cars in Switzerland
Tourist attractions in the canton of Zürich
Public transport in Switzerland
Transport in the canton of Zürich
Buildings and structures in the canton of Zürich
1954 establishments in Switzerland
Transport companies established in 1954